‎The capture of Tunis‎  was a battle in which the Ziyyanid ‎‎army, under the command of Yahya Ibn Moussa and the Hafsid pretender Mohamed Ibn Abu Amran, took possession of ‎‎Tunis‎‎ as part of the Ziyyanid campaigns conducted in Ifriqiya‎‎ during the reign of Sultan Abu Tâshfîn.‎‎ ‎

Context 
After his defeat at the battle of er Rais, ‎‎the Hafsid caliph‎‎ took refuge in Annaba.‎‎ The Zianid army, under the command of General Yahya Ibn Moussa, marched on ‎‎Tunis‎‎ accompanied by the pretender to the Hafsid throne, Mohamed Ibn Abu Umran.

Battle

‎Consequences 
In November–December 1329, Tunis fell to the attackers‎ the city of Tunis was now ruled by Mohamed Ibn Abu Umran and Ziyyanid general Yahya Ibn Moussa‎‎ who made the Hafsid dynasty their vassal. However, Abu Umran's rule did not last long. In May 1330 the Hafsid Sultan Abu Yahya Abu Bakr‎‎ sought the help of the Merinids‎‎ to regain possession of his kingdom.

See also 

 Siege of Béjaïa (1326-1329)
 Battle of Temzezdekt
 Battle of er Rias

References 

History of Tunis
Conflicts in 1329
14th century in Ifriqiya
Military history of Tunisia